Raub may refer to:

 Raub, Pahang, a town in Malaysia
 Raub (federal constituency) in Malaysia
 Raub District in Malaysia
 Raub, Indiana, a village in Indiana, USA
 Raub (crater), a crater on Mars
 Raub (card game), a Croatian card game of the Rams group